C. R. Subbaraman also known as C. S. Ram (1916–1952) was a famous South Indian film music composer and producer. He was born to Ramasamy at Chintamani village in Thirunelveli, in present-day Tamil Nadu. Music director Shankar of Shankar–Ganesh duo was his younger brother. His ancestors were from the Krishna district of present-day Andhra Pradesh and due to this, his family spoke Telugu well.

During his short lifespan of about 36 years and cinema life of 10 years, he made lasting fame with films like Devadasu, Ratnamala, Chenchu Lakshmi, Balaraju, Laila Majnu and others.

Early life
Little is known about the music teachers of Subbaraman. Initially he had learned music from a Nadhaswaram player in Kumbakonam. He was a remarkable learner where whatever that he practised during the morning, could be able to delivered in the evening. He was well versed in harmonium at the age of 14.

At the age of 16 under the recommendation of G. Ramanathan's brother Sundara Bagavathar, Subbaraman joined the HMV as Harmonist. HMV is a gramophone production and distribution company, under which there was a permanent orchestra led by R. Chinnaiah. S. Rajeswara Rao also was with HMV. At that time, Ramasamy Iyer and Subbaraman were residing in Mylapore. Accompanied by his father, he would walk all the way to learn piano from a piano teacher in Triplicane (Thiruvallikkeni). Owing to his talent and passion towards music, he became the assistant music director in HMV very quickly.

Subbaraman would sing keerthanas in the nights after work. He would be accompanied by a young violinist who had been a temporary worker in HMV. Sensing the talent, Subbaraman had not only recommended the young chap to be hired permanently in HMV but also appointed him as his assistant. The talented young violinist was no other than T. K. Ramamoorthy.

Career
When HMV was offered to compose music for cinema under the banner Tamil Nadu Talkies for the Telugu film Chenchu Lakshmi (1943), R. Chinnaiah had the opportunity as the music director.

First film
When R. Chinnaiah suddenly fell ill after completion of 1 or 2 songs the task was taken up by S. Rajeswara Rao. Due to some unavoidable reasons Rajeswara Rao was not able to complete the songs and the chance rolled over to Subbaraman.  Subbaraman completed the rest of the songs with the assistance of Samudrala Sr. He had boldly introduced some changes in the music field of those days by introducing Latin American music along with carnatic music and won accolades of the viewers. Chenchu Lakshmi was a success which hoisted Subbaraman as a music director for cinema.

At the same time R. Chinnaiah died, and Subbaraman took over the responsibilities to lead the HMV orchestra. His compositions were well received in the market. He had won praises from higher authorities of HMV which were based in Kolkata, an Englishman who had written to Subbaraman congratulating him for the magnificent sales which had resulted from the remarkable music composition. But due to the inconsistent salary, Subbaraman had to leave HMV to look for a permanent remuneration.

Debut into films
M. K. Thyagaraja Bhagavathar (MKT) who had been listening and pleased with the music had invited Subbaraman to compose music for his next to be venture 'Uthayanan' (1945). It was a dream of the music directors of that era that to compose music from MKT's songs. Subbaraman had worked day and night profusely to have put out the best tunes. MKT came to the recording theatre was briefed through the tunes and was prepared to sing when the recording was interrupted by his Mamundi Achari and MKT needed to leave. MKT was arrested later in the evening for the murder of Lakshmikanthan. Uthayanan has been temporarily halted. But when MKT was sentenced to jail, the producer proceeded to make the movie with G. N. Balasubramaniam. Subbaraman was considered unlucky and was replaced by C. S. Jayaraman.

The next movie chance came in 1947 where he started to work with Bharani Pictures which belongs to P. Bhanumathi for Ratnamala with Ghantasala. Initially he composed for all the films produced by Bharani then onwards till his death. From Laila Majnu, Prema till Chandirani. For his last three hits Marumagal, Devadas and Chandi Rani released in 1953 he managed to compose all the songs well in advance, but died during the composition of background music to be completed by his assistants M. S. Viswanathan & T. K. Ramamoorthy.

In 1948, he started composing for Prathiba Pictures which belongs to Ghantasala Balaramayya beginning with Balaraju, Swapna Sundari and Sri Lakshmamma Katha.

In 1948 also, Subbaraman composed music for Raja Mukthi of M. K. Thyagaraja Bhagavathar starrer. Subbaraman also worked with N. S. Krishnan in Paithiyakkaran (1947), Nallathambi (1949) and Manamagal (1951).

When Jupiter Pictures moved to Madras,  it was S. M. Subbaiah Naidu recommended his talented assistant M. S. Viswanathan to Subbaraman to be taken as his assistant which Subbaraman had accepted.

He worked with singers like Ghantalasa, A. M. Rajah, Thiruchi Loganathan, V. N. Sundharam, T. A. Mothi, M. L. Vasanthakumari, P. A. Periyanayaki, P. Leela, T. V. Rathnam, R. Balasaraswathi Devi, A. P. Komala, K. Jamuna Rani, K. Rani, P. Susheela and K. V. Janaki.

The singing actors M. K. Thyagaraja Bhagavathar, P. U. Chinnappa, C. S. R. Anjaneyulu, U. R. Jeevarathinam, T. R. Mahalingam, T. R. Rajakumari, K. R. Ramasamy, V. Nagayya, P. Bhanumathi, N. S. Krishnan, T. A. Madhuram and S. Varalakshmi also sang memorable songs under his compositions.

Vinoda Pictures
He became one of the partners along with lyricist Samudrala Sr., director/kuchipudi dancer Vedantam Raghavayya and producer D.L. Narayana and started Vinoda Pictures in 1950. They had produced Strisahasam, Shanti and Devadasu/Devadas. Subbaraman had composed 6 to 7 songs for Devadasu/Devadas when he died suddenly. Then, M. S. Viswanathan & T. K. Ramamoorthy completed the balance three songs.

Subbaraman had been instrumental in introducing Ghantasala to Tamil film by the movie Paithiyakaran (1947) and also made debut of M. L. Vasanthakumari in Raja Mukthi (1948). Subbaraman also gave lessons to P. Leela and chance to sing under his compositions which made her very famous. He was a trend setter in music composition during his heyday.

All of the films where music were composed by him were mega musical were hit. He had composed more for Telugu films than Tamil films. He died at the very young age of 36 after a long battle with illnesses. The rest works were done by Viswanathan–Ramamoorthy duo.

Filmography

Music director

Playback Singer

Film producer
Under Vinoda Pictures

References

Parijatham (1950)
Ratnakumar (1949)

External links

Tamil article on C. R. Subbaraman

Telugu film score composers
Telugu film producers
1916 births
1952 deaths
Indian male composers
Tamil film score composers
Tamil musicians
20th-century Indian composers
Film producers from Tamil Nadu
Tamil film producers
Musicians from Tamil Nadu
People from Tirunelveli district
Male film score composers
20th-century male musicians